The Logar River (also Lowgar) is a river of Afghanistan. It gives the name to the Logar Valley and Logar Province. In Maidan Wardak Province where the river originates, it is called Chak River. The Chaki Wardak Dam is built on the river in Chaki Wardak District, Maidan Wardak Province.

The Logar River drains a wide tract of country, rising in Maidan Wardak Province in the southern slopes of the Sanglakh Range and receiving tributaries from hills in the Kharwar District, north-east of Ghazni. It joins the Kabul River a few kilometres below the city of Kabul. Lying in the vicinity of the capital, the district contributes significantly to its food supply.

External links
More details on the "underground city"
Land cover map (April 2002)

Former populated places in Afghanistan
Kabul River
Landforms of Logar Province
Rivers of Afghanistan
Rivers of Pakistan
Valleys of Afghanistan